Silo 14 is a 1983 board game published by Jersey Devil/Centurion Games.

Gameplay
Silo 14 is a game about a doomsday scenario from Jersey Devil's Centurion line of games and is suited for both solitaire and multi-player gaming.

Reception
Suzanne Stevens reviewed Silo 14 in Space Gamer No. 67. Stevens commented that "When you manage to beat the odds, Silo 14 has its exciting and gratifying moments, but the game is not for the impatient or the easily discouraged. For those ready for a challenge, however, Silo 14 makes for an amusing hour of game playing."

References

Board games introduced in 1983